Margerita Kokarevitch is a Soviet rower. Alongside Antonina Zelikovich, she became world champion in the women's double scull at the 1981 World Rowing Championships in Oberschleißheim outside Munich, Germany.

References

Year of birth missing
Russian female rowers
World Rowing Championships medalists for the Soviet Union